9000 series may refer to:

Train types

Japanese train types
 Chiba New Town Railway 9000 series electric multiple unit train
 Hankyu 9000 series electric multiple unit train
 Hanshin 9000 series electric multiple unit train, operated by Hanshin Electric Railway
 Keihan 9000 series electric multiple unit train
 Keio 9000 series electric multiple unit train
 Kintetsu 9000 series electric multiple unit train, operated by Kintetsu Railway
 Kita-Osaka Kyuko 9000 series electric multiple unit train
 Nankai 9000 series electric multiple unit train, operated by Nankai Electric Railway
 Nishitetsu 9000 series electric multiple unit train
 Odakyu 9000 series electric multiple unit train, operated by Odakyu Electric Railway
 Sapporo Municipal Subway 9000 series electric multiple unit train
 Seibu 9000 series electric multiple unit train
 Sotetsu 9000 series electric multiple unit train
 Tobu 9000 series electric multiple unit train
 Toei 9000 series tramcar
 Tokyo Metro 9000 series electric multiple unit train
 Tokyu 9000 series electric multiple unit train, operated by Tokyu Corporation

Korean train types 
 Seoul Metro 9000 series

Latin American and Spanish train types
 Barcelona Metro 9000 Series for the Barcelona, Santo Domingo, and Lima Metros

Computing
 UNIVAC 9000 series

See also
 900 series (disambiguation)